Beech Hill is an unincorporated community in Franklin County, in the U.S. state of Tennessee.

History
The community was likely named from the presence of beech trees near the town site. A violent F4 tornado destroyed the town on February 13, 1952.

References

Unincorporated communities in Franklin County, Tennessee
Unincorporated communities in Tennessee